Khin Myat was a principal queen consort of King Tabinshwehti of Toungoo Dynasty of Burma (Myanmar). Her father Shin Nita was part of the 7-person royal household staff that raised Tabinshwehti. In 1530, she and her friend Khin Hpone Soe became queens of Tabinshwehti.

References

Bibliography
 
 

Queens consort of Toungoo dynasty
16th-century Burmese women